Sheykh Abud (also Romanized as Sheykh ‘Abūd, Sheykh ‘Abbūd, and Sheykh Abūd; also known as Shaikhābād, Sheykh ‘Abūd-e Beyẕā', and Sheykh ‘Obbūd) is a village in Kushk-e Hezar Rural District, Beyza District, Sepidan County, Fars Province, Iran. At the 2006 census, its population was 2,906, in 706 families.

References 

Populated places in Beyza County